The Honda Nighthawk is the US model designation for some of Honda's CB series of motorcycles.

This class includes:
 CB250
 CB450SC
 CB550SC 
 CB650SC 
 CB700SC 
 CB750
 CB750SC

Nighthawk